Samuel Naffziger is an electrical engineer at Advanced Micro Devices in Fort Collins, Colorado. He was named a Fellow of the Institute of Electrical and Electronics Engineers (IEEE) in 2014 for his leadership in the development of power management and low-power processor technologies.

References

Fellow Members of the IEEE
Living people
Year of birth missing (living people)
Place of birth missing (living people)
American electrical engineers